Brendan B. McCarthy (August 6, 1945 – August 26, 1997) was an American football running back in the National Football League and American Football League. He was drafted by the Green Bay Packers in the fourth round of the 1968 Common Draft. In August of that year he was traded to the Detroit Lions for undisclosed future draft pick. McCarthy then moved on to the Atlanta Falcons, where he played in 7 games before being released by coach Norm Van Brocklin. McCarthy played 9 games over two seasons with the Denver Broncos before eventually moving on to real estate.

McCarthy died on August 26, 1997 after a heart attack at his vacation home on Deep Creek Lake.

Statistics

References

See also
 List of American Football League players

1945 births
1997 deaths
American football running backs
Atlanta Falcons players
Boston College Eagles football players
Denver Broncos players
Detroit Lions players
Green Bay Packers players
Parade High School All-Americans (boys' basketball)
DeMatha Catholic High School alumni
Players of American football from Boston
People from Garrett County, Maryland